Marion is an unincorporated community and census-designated place (CDP) in Franklin County, Pennsylvania, United States. As of the 2020 census, the population was 851.

Interstate 81 passes along the eastern edge of the community, with access from Exit 10 (Pennsylvania Route 914). I-81 leads northeastward  to Carlisle and south  to Hagerstown, Maryland.

Marion was originally called Independence, and under the latter name was laid out circa 1810. A post office called Marion has been in operation since 1833. The present name is after Francis Marion, army officer during the American Revolutionary War, known as the Swamp Fox.

Demographics

References 

Census-designated places in Franklin County, Pennsylvania
Census-designated places in Pennsylvania